Sam the Skull is a song by Harry Hagan about a fictional cat said to roam around Glasgow, Scotland. Sam the Skull is said to be a very tough cat, and in the song he describes himself as having "claws in ma paws like a crocodiles jaws and a heid like a fermers bull", and he boasts of strangling rats and occasional dogs. It is also told that the bars on the prisoner windows are not to keep prisoners inside, they are to keep out the Skull. However, the story is that the RSPCA came to catch him in a car, but he stole the car and drove away, and now resides with a bird, in a single end in Maryhill.

The song was recorded by Alastair McDonald for his album Scottish Lauglines, but it has been recorded a few times, for example by the Scottish band Gaberlunzie or by the Scottish Folk group The Wherries.

The song Tha Lugton Dug (Scots for Lugton Dog'''), by Alastair McDonald, tells a story about a dog just as tough as Sam the Skull. The story ends, after the Dog tells about him eating vampire bats:And apart frae that, thaure's a Glasgae cat, boot Ah ate him last nicht fer tea!''

External links
 Lyrics

Fictional cats
Scottish songs